Guillermo Jones (born May 5, 1972) is a Panamanian former professional boxer who competed from 1993 to 2017. He held the WBA cruiserweight title from 2008 to 2012, and challenged twice for the WBA super welterweight title in 1998.

Professional career
Jones made his professional debut in 1993 as a welterweight, and was a world champion as a  cruiserweight 20 years later in 2013 He won his first 21 bouts in Panama, but was then stopped in Venezuela in two rounds by David Noel of Trinidad and Tobago in September 1997. He avenged that loss two months later in Panama by first round Knockout. Now aligned with promoter Don King, Jones fought two light middleweight WBA world title bouts against Laurent Boudouani in 1998. He drew once and lost the rematch by split decision in 12 round contests.

Jones fought his way through four weight classes. Later fighting as a cruiserweight in 2002, he fought Johnny Nelson for the WBO World cruiserweight title, drawing in 12 rounds in his third world title attempt.  Most in attendance thought Jones had done enough to win the title from Nelson.

After yet another split decision loss in 2005 to future cruiserweight world title holder Steve Cunningham, Jones rebounded the same year with knockouts of Kelvin Davis and Wayne Braithwaite.

Jones got a shot at WBA World Cruiserweight champion Firat Arslan on September 27, 2008 and won the WBA world title by tenth round stoppage.  He was the heaviest, and the oldest professional fighter from Panama to have achieved a world championship when he became Panama's 28th world boxing champion. After winning the WBA title, Jones created controversy when he went through a two year period of inactivity while remaining WBA world champion.

In August 2010, the WBA finally threatened to strip Jones of his belt unless he defended his world title. As a result, he made his first defense of his world title against Valery Brudov in October 2010, scoring an eleventh round stoppage in Panama City.

Jones second defense of his title was scheduled to take place on June 25, 2011, against then undefeated Ryan Coyne. A few days before the fight, Jones pulled out, citing a back injury sustained following a training session. Jones later announced he would make a mandatory defense against Yoan Pablo Hernández. The fight was scheduled to take place in Germany on August 27, 2011, but the bout was cancelled with no specific reason.

Jones the defended his WBA world title against Mike Marrone. The fight took place in Florida on November 5, 2011, with Jones retaining his title via a TKO in the sixth round. After over a year of inactivity, Jones was declared the champion in recess after he backed out of a title defense against boxer Andres Taylor of Pennsylvania. Denis Lebedev of Russia won the interim WBA World title and then won the vacant WBA World title after Jones refused to fight him. After 18 months of inactivity, Jones traveled to Russia to fight Lebedev and settle matters regarding who the legitimate WBA world champion was, himself or Lebedev.

On May 17, 2013, Jones, the WBA World Cruiserweight champion 'in recess', cut and closed the left eye of Denis Lebedev in the first round. He eventually knocked out the other WBA World Cruiserweight champion 'claimant', Denis Lebedev of Russia, at 1:54 of the eleventh round to settle the issue once and for all as to who the true WBA World Cruiserweight champion was. The bout is the first WBA World title bout in which two defending champions of the same world title belt faced each other. Jones inflicted horrific punishment on Lebedev, inflicting enough damage to Lebedev's right eye to perhaps end his career for medical reasons. Observers felt the bout should have been stopped early, but the Russian Boxing Federation would not stop the bout so it would go the distance, putting Jones in the position of having to knock Lebedev out in hostile territory to keep his title.

In October 2013, Jones was stripped of his title for failing a drug test for his WBA unification fight with Lebedev, with Lebedev being reinstated as full champion. A rematch between Lebedev and Jones has concordantly been ordered by the WBA.  Jones again tested positive, and was stripped of the title, however recent allegations of Russian tampering with drug testing has put this finding in doubt. In December 2013, Jones was reinstated by the WBA as Champion in Recess.

Professional boxing record

References

External links

Cruiserweight boxers
Doping cases in boxing
1972 births
Living people
Panamanian male boxers
World cruiserweight boxing champions
World Boxing Association champions
Light-middleweight boxers
Welterweight boxers
Heavyweight boxers
20th-century Panamanian people